Nicolás "Nico" Estévez Martínez (born 29 January 1980) is a Spanish football manager, who is the current head coach of Major League Soccer club FC Dallas.

Career
Born in Valencia, Estévez began his career with the youth categories of local side CF San José, at the age of just 19. In 2004, he was hired by Valencia CF to work in their youth setup.

In July 2011, Estévez was appointed manager of newly-created side Huracán Valencia CF in Segunda División B. On 1 July 2013, after missing out promotion twice in the play-offs, he announced his departure from the club, and returned to Valencia three days later, after being named in charge of the reserves also in the third level.

On 16 December 2013, Estévez was named interim manager of Valencia's first team, after Miroslav Đukić was dismissed. He was in charge of the team for two matches, a 1–0 Copa del Rey home win against Gimnàstic de Tarragona and a 2–3 La Liga home loss against Real Madrid; at the age of 33, he became the second-youngest manager in the history of the club, only behind Óscar Fernández, also an interim. Shortly after, he returned to his previous role with Mestalla after the appointment of Juan Antonio Pizzi.

Estévez was sacked by Mestalla on 7 April 2014, after nine winless matches, and was replaced by Curro Torres. In September, he moved abroad and joined American side Columbus Crew SC, as a Director of Methodology.

On 6 January 2017, Estévez was promoted to assistant coach of Gregg Berhalter in Crew SC's first team. On 16 January 2019, he followed Berhalter to the United States men's soccer team, again as his assistant.

On 2 December 2021, Estévez was announced as the new head coach of Major League Soccer side FC Dallas. In his first season in charge of the side, he qualified them for the playoffs, finishing third on the Western Conference with 53 points, 20 more than last year; it was the biggest year-over-year improvement in the club's history.

Managerial statistics

Honours

Individual
Segunda División B Group 3 Best Coach (Ramón Cobo Award): 2012–13

References

External links

1980 births
Living people
Sportspeople from Valencia
Spanish football managers
La Liga managers
Segunda División B managers
Huracán Valencia CF managers
Valencia CF managers
Columbus Crew non-playing staff
FC Dallas coaches
Spanish expatriate football managers
Spanish expatriate sportspeople in the United States
Expatriate soccer managers in the United States
Valencia CF Mestalla managers
Valencia CF non-playing staff